David H. Watters (born December 28, 1950) is an American politician from the state of New Hampshire. A Democrat, Watters has represented the 4th district in the New Hampshire Senate since 2012. Prior to his election to the Senate, he served two terms in the New Hampshire House of Representatives for Strafford's 4th district. He worked as a college English professor before entering politics. His son is ballet artist Harper Watters.

References

1957 births
21st-century American politicians
Living people
Democratic Party members of the New Hampshire House of Representatives
Democratic Party New Hampshire state senators
Dartmouth College alumni
Brown University alumni